Piravanthoor  is a village in Kollam district in the state of Kerala, India. Piravanthoor is a part of Pathanapuram Block Panchayat and Kollam district Panchayat.

Demographics
 India census, Piravanthoor had a population of 23336 with 11222 males and 12114 females.

Schools in Piravanthoor
 
 Gdhs Piravanthoor School
 Punnala VHSS
 Valiyakavu HS
 Piravanthoor GD HS
 Chekom LPS
 Elikkattoor LPS
 Kamukumchery New LPS
 Karavoor LPS
 Vanmala LPS
 Chempanaruvi St. Paul's MSC LPS
 Piravanthoor UPS

Offices and Places of Piravanthoor 

 Piravanthoor Krishi Bhavan
 Piravanthoor Co-operative Bank
 The Pentecostal mission
 St.Mary Orthodox Church

References

Villages in Kollam district